Pembroke Township was an area adjoining the city of Dublin, Ireland, formed for local government purposes by private Act of Parliament in 1863. The township took its name from the fact that most of the area was part of the estate of the Earl of Pembroke. The township was governed by commissioners until 1899 when it became an Urban District. In 1930 Pembroke Township was absorbed by the City and County Borough of Dublin.

Composition
The township consisted of a number of distinct areas: Ballsbridge, Donnybrook, Sandymount, Irishtown and Ringsend. The areas varied in nature, with Ringsend being an old fishing village, Irishtown a working-class residential and industrial district, while the remainder of the township contained affluent residential areas. Seven-ninths of the township was part of the Pembroke Estate, and the agent of the estate was an  commissioner, the remaining 14 being elected by property owners. The Estate had a great deal of influence on the activities of the commissioners, and also made donations of land for the use of the township. This influence largely ended when a more democratically elected urban district council replaced the commissioners in 1899.

Electoral history

Town Hall
Pembroke Town Hall was built on Merrion Road, Ballsbridge, and opened in 1880. Previously the township offices had been in nearby Ballsbridge Terrace. The town hall later formed the administrative headquarters of the City of Dublin Vocational Education Committee.

Dissolution
Following many years during which proposed amalgamations of Dublin local authorities were discussed, the Local Government (Dublin) Act 1930 dissolved Pembroke Urban District and added its area to the functional area of the City of Dublin.

Sources

 Dublin's Suburban Towns, Séamas Ó Maitiú, Dublin 2003

External links

 History of Pembroke Township
 Pembroke Urban District 1880–1930 layer on OpenStreetMap
 Dublin Historic Maps: Dublin Townships and Urban Districts, between 1847 and 1930

History of County Dublin
Local government in County Dublin
Former local authorities in the Republic of Ireland